Intextomyces is a genus of fungi belonging to the family Hyphodermataceae.

The genus has almost cosmopolitan distribution.

Species:

Intextomyces aureus 
Intextomyces contiguus 
Intextomyces cystidiatus 
Intextomyces umbrinus

References

Polyporales
Polyporales genera